Nettleham Football Club is an English football club based in Nettleham, near Lincoln, in Lincolnshire. The club are currently members of the Lincolnshire League and play at Mulsanne Park.

History
Nettleham Football Club is an English Football Club based in Nettleham village, near Lincoln, in Lincolnshire. The club are currently members of the Lincolnshire League and play at Mulsanne Park. The club was established in 1905 as Nettleham United. They joined the Premier Division of the Central Midlands League in 1987. The club adopted its current name in 1989, and in their first season under their new name, finished third in the division and were promoted to the Supreme Division. They began entering the FA Vase in 1990 and reached the Second Round in 1995–96. In 2011 the club left the Central Midlands League to join the Lincolnshire League

Ground
Nettleham play at Mulsanne Park, Nettleham.

Records
FA Vase
Second Round 1995–96
Challenge Cup winners 2021-2022

References

External links
 https://www.pitchero.com/clubs/nettlehamfootballclub/

Association football clubs established in 1905
Football clubs in England
Sport in Lincoln, England
Football clubs in Lincolnshire
1905 establishments in England
Central Midlands Football League
Lincolnshire Football League